Namdeo Dhondo Mahanor (born 16 September 1942) is a Marathi poet, lyricist, farmer and former MLC.

He was awarded the Padma Shri, the fourth-highest civilian honour of India, by the President of India in 1991. In addition to writing books, he has also written lyrics for Marathi movies like 'Jait re Jait', 'Doghi; 'Ek Hota Vidushak'.

References

1942 births
Marathi people
Recipients of the Padma Shri in literature & education
Living people
Recipients of the Sahitya Akademi Award in Marathi